The Coosa pebblesnail, scientific name Somatogyrus coosaensis, is a species of small freshwater snails with a gill and an operculum,  aquatic gastropod mollusks in the family Hydrobiidae. This species is endemic to the United States.  Its natural habitat is rivers.

References

Endemic fauna of the United States
Molluscs of the United States
Somatogyrus
Gastropods described in 1904
Taxonomy articles created by Polbot